Hakea strumosa is a shrub in the family Proteacea endemic to an area in the  Wheatbelt, Great Southern and the Goldfields-Esperance regions of Western Australia. A  dense, very prickly shrub with a profusion of small, deep pink or red flowers in spring.

Description
The branchlets and young leaves are smooth or has dense, flattened, rusty-coloured silky hairs. The inflorescence usually consists of 4 and occasionally 6-10  small, deep pink or red mildly scented flowers in axillary clusters  along the upright branchlets. Flowering occurs from September to October.

Taxonomy and naming
Hakea strumosa was first formally described by Carl Meisner in 1855 and published the description in Prodromus Systematis Naturalis Regni Vegetabilis. Named from the Latin strumosus - a reference to the thick stalk supporting the fruit.

Distribution and habitat
This species is found growing in low heath on sand, sometimes over laterite from Tammin in the central wheatbelt, ranging south to Bremer Bay and Esperance.

Conservation status
Hakea strumosa is classified as "not threatened" by the Western Australian Government Department of Parks and Wildlife.

References

strumosa
Eudicots of Western Australia